The 2019 Games of the Small States of Europe, also known as the XVIII Games of the Small States of Europe, took place in Budva, Montenegro, from 27 May to 1 June 2019.

Development and preparation 

After the Games, The Malta Independent reported that many of the facilities were "not up to standard" and that the athletics track had been finished just 24 hours before events were due to start.

Venues

Games
The 2019 Games were the first time Montenegro has hosted the event since its inception into the GSSE in 2009.

The Games opened on the 27 May 2019 with around 2000 people attending the ceremony.

Participating teams

  (details) (27)
  (details) (142)
  (details) (120)
  (details) (33)
  (details) (140)
  (details) (80)
  (details) (116)
  (host nation) (details) (130)
  (details) (58)

Both the Faroe Islands and the Vatican City expressed an interest in participating in the Games but neither have an official Olympic Committee, one of the requirements of participation in the GSSE.

Sports
There were competitions in ten different disciplines:

 
 
 
 
 
 
 
 
 
 Volleyball 
  Beach volleyball

Calendar

Medal table
Luxembourg topped the medal table, winning 77 medals including 26 golds.

References

External links
Official website

 
Games of the Small States of Europe
International sports competitions hosted by Montenegro
Multi-sport events in Montenegro
Small States of Europe
Small States of Europe
Small States of Europe
Games of the Small States of Europe
Games of the Small States of Europe
Sports competitions in Podgorica
Sport in Budva
Tivat
Sport in Bar, Montenegro
Cetinje